Ladina is a feminine given name in regular use in Liechtenstein, and the Romansh community in Switzerland. It may mean "woman from Latium" in Romansh.

References

Swiss feminine given names